Evergreen is a holiday studio album by Pentatonix, released in 2021. It is their fifth Christmas-themed album and their eleventh album overall. It received a Grammy Award nomination for Best Traditional Pop Vocal Album.

Background 
The album was announced on September 27, 2021, along with the release of the single "It's Been A Long, Long Time". Their renditions of I Just Called to Say I Love You, Over the River, and The Prayer were also singles. The album was released on October 29, 2021, with a tour starting soon after.

Track listing

Charts

References

2021 Christmas albums
Pentatonix albums
RCA Records Christmas albums